Valley Forge is an extinct town in St. Francois County, in the U.S. state of Missouri.

History
A variant spelling was "Valle Forge." Valley Forge had its start in 1854 when one Mr. Valle built a blast furnace at the town site. A post office called Valley Forge was established in 1867, and remained in operation until 1900.

References

Ghost towns in Missouri
Former populated places in St. Francois County, Missouri